Narayanan Vijayaraj Alagarswami  (born 25 August 1952), better known by his stage name Vijayakanth, is an Indian politician and former actor who has worked predominantly in Tamil cinema. He was the Leader of the Opposition in the Tamil Nadu Legislative Assembly from 2011 to 2016. Before entering politics Vijayakanth was a successful actor, producer and director. Vijayakanth is also the current DMDK chairman of Tamil Nadu legislative assembly. He is the founder and president, general secretary of the Desiya Murpokku Dravida Kazhagam (DMDK) Political party and served as a Member of Legislative Assembly twice representing the constituency of Virudhachalam and Rishivandiyam respectively.

Personal life
Vijayakanth was born as Vijayaraj Alagarswami in Madurai on 25 August 1952. his parents are K. N. Alagarswami and Aandal Azhagarswami. He married Premalatha on 31 January 1990 and has two sons named Vijaya Prabhakaran and Shanmuga Pandian, an actor who starred in Sagaptham (2015) and Madura Veeran (2018).

Acting career
Vijayakanth is one of very few Tamil actors to have acted only in Tamil films throughout his career. His films have mostly been dubbed into Telugu and Hindi. Vijayakanth, had the title "Puratchi Kalaignar" (revolutionary artist) in the film industry. He is also known for portraying a patriotic, village do-gooder and dual role acting in his films. Many refused to play with him and great filmmakers did not show up to make films. He has acted in more than 20 films as a police officer. He is best known for low-budget films that showcased gravity-defying stunts in which he would single-handedly dispatch his enemies. Most of his films revolved around corruption, honesty and keeping up promises. He worked 3 shifts per day and that was his dedication towards his craft. Vijayakanth took delayed remunerations and sometimes didn't take them at all to benefit the struggling producers. More importantly, he didn't try to publicize these and had let the world see it for themselves and take inspiration. Upon entering the film industry to pursue an acting career, he changed to "Vijayakanth", dropping the "Raj" out of his name and suffixing it with "Kanth," by his first film M. A. Kaja's Inikkum Ilamai (1979). He then had success with Sattam Oru Iruttarai (1981), directed by S. A. Chandrasekhar; with whom he did movies mostly. In the 1980s and 1990s, he was an action icon with a consistent box-office appeal. He got the sobriquet "Captain" after the 100th film, Captain Prabhakaran (1991).

1979 to 1989: Early career
Vijayakanth was cast in Inikkum Ilamai (1979), his first film where he played an antagonist, which was directed by M. A. Kaja. His subsequent films Agal Vilakku (1979), Neerottam (1980) and Saamanthippoo (1980) were box-office flops. His film Doorathu Idi Muzhakkam (1980), was screened at the Indian Panorama of the International Film Festival of India. However the film that strongly launched him as a commercial hero was Sattam Oru Iruttarai (1981), directed by S. A. Chandrasekhar. It was remade in Hindi, Telugu, Malayalam and Kannada languages. In his formative years, Vijayakanth acted in films carrying revolutionary and radical thoughts such as Sivappu Malli (1981) and Jadhikkoru Needhi (1981). In these films, he brilliantly portrayed the angry young revolutionist characters. He then played a villain role in Om Shakti (1982) but after which he has never portrayed antagonist characters in his career.

Slowly he started acting in commercial films on action, romance and sentiment themes and gradually rose to the top and with many super hits films like Nooravathu Naal (1984) and Vaidhegi Kaathirunthaal (1984). This year, he had 18 releases. He became the Tamil cinema actor to release the most films in a year in the lead role. He acted in Annai Bhoomi 3D (1985), the first 3D film made in the Tamil film industry where he acted alongside Radha Ravi and Kannada actor Tiger Prabhakar. He co-starred with Kannada superstar actor Vishnuvardhan in Eetti (1985). The romantic comedy film Naane Raja Naane Mandhiri (1985), in which he is a self-centered egoistic village Zamindar, who makes fun of people was a commercial success. He acted in Amman Kovil Kizhakale (1986), which earnt him a Filmfare Award for Best Actor – Tamil. He also acted in Manakanakku (1986), the only film where Kamal Haasan and Vijayakanth worked together, followed by Oomai Vizhigal (1986) which became a cult classic. It portrayed him in an unusual role of an aged cop. He became an indisputable competitor of stalwarts Rajinikanth and Kamal Haasan. In 1987, he co-starred with Sivaji Ganesan in Veerapandiyan, followed by successful movies as Cooliekkaran, Veeran Veluthambi, Ninaive Oru Sangeetham, Sattam Oru Vilayaattu and Uzhavan Magan. In 1988, he worked in films such as Therkathi Kallan, Nallavan  and Poonthotta Kaavalkaaran. In Senthoora Poove, Vijayakanth won a Tamil Nadu State Film Award for Best Actor. In 1989, he also starred in two other super hit films such as Paattukku Oru Thalaivan and Ponmana Selvan. This followed the crime Rajanadai and the Hindu devotional film Meenakshi Thiruvilayadal.

1990 to 1999: Action roles
Throughout the 1990s, Vijayakanth excelled in versatile roles in a variety of films falling under various genres though he is more popular as an action hero including Pulan Visaranai and had R. Sarathkumar portraying the antagonist. Directed by R. K. Selvamani, this film was considered to be one of the best Tamil crime thrillers of its time. Vijayakanth starred superhit cop flick Sathriyan, produced by Mani Ratnam, about an honest cop and a corrupt politician. After the success of Pulan Visaranai, Rowther decided to start another project with Vijayakanth and director R. K. Selvamani, titled Captain Prabhakaran (1991). It was Vijayakanth's 100th film, after which he earned the sobriquet "Captain" ever since he portrayed an IFS officer. After M.G.R, Sivaji Ganesan and Jayalalithaa, he is the only actor to have tasted a silver jubilee hit in his 100th film. The film was a commercial success upon its release, followed by Maanagara Kaaval (1991) and Moondrezhuthil En Moochirukkum (1991). Vijayakanth worked in films such as Chinna Gounder (1992). This film was radically different from Vijayakanth's earlier portrayals, as he was donning the role of a soft-spoken village chieftain. This film was ranked third in Tamil Nadu State Film Award for Best Film, followed by Bharathan (1992), Thai Mozhi (1992) and Kaviya Thalaivan (1992). He has also appeared in various roles such as Koyil Kaalai (1993), Ezhai Jaathi (1993), Sakkarai Devan (1993), Rajadurai (1993) and  Enga Muthalali (1993). He co-starred with the son of the director S. A. Chandrasekhar, Vijay in Sendhoorapandi (1993), where Vijayakanth plays the role of elder brother. Director SAC thought a film with Vijayakanth would give an impetus to Vijay's film career. Vijayakanth played an extended cameo role in this film for which he did not take any remuneration. He turned out to be a hit.  In 1994, he appears in Sethupathi IPS, Honest Raj, Pathavi Pramanam, En Aasai Machan and Periya Marudhu. He then acted in Karuppu Nila (1995), Thirumoorthy (1995) and Gandhi Pirantha Mann (1995). For his performance in the action film Thayagam (1996), he won a Tamil Nadu State Film Award Special Prize. This was followed by Tamizh Selvan and Alexander. In 1997, his film Dharma Chakkaram (1997), was directed by K. S. Ravikumar. He acted in his 125th film Ulavuthurai (1998), followed by Dharma (1998) and Veeram Vilanja Mannu (1998). His following films were  Kallazhagar (1999), Periyanna (1999) where he played alongside Suriya. He also starred in R. B. Choudary's production, Kannupada Poguthaiya (1999)  under the banner Super Good Films.

2000 to 2009: Experience roles 
In 2000s, Vijayakanth continued his success streak with blockbusters films as Vaanathai Pola a rural family drama directed by Vikraman, which won two awards; a Tamil Nadu State Film Award for Best Film of the year and National Film Award for Best Popular Film Providing Wholesome Entertainment. This was followed by Vallarasu and Simmasanam. After this year, he again played in action films such as Vaanchinathan (2001) directed by Shaji Kailas and Narasimha (2001). Then came Viswanathan Ramamoorthy (2001), in which he made a cameo appearance and the village drama Thavasi (2001). All these films received mixed reviews from critics at the box office. In 2002, he acted in Raajjiyam followed by Devan, co-starring with the actor and directed by Arun Pandian. In director AR Murugadoss's Ramanaa, he underplayed as a realistic action hero and gave life to the role of an anti-corruption crusader. He won a Tamil Nadu State Film Award for Best Film of the year and became a commercially successful. In 2003, he had two releases, Chokka Thangam, a family drama and Thennavan, a political film. In 2004, he appeared in  a comedy drama, Engal Anna which was a success, however Gajendra and Neranja Manasu received negative reviews. Later, he did a special appearance in Suriya's film Maayavi (2005) as himself. In 2006, he acted in three action films, Sudesi, Perarasu and Dharmapuri. The next year, he starred in Sabari (2007). His 150th film was Arasangam (2008), about a police officer who discovers and unravels the mystery behind a terrorist gang plotting to steal information about the growth of the Indian economy, set in Chennai then Toronto. He acted in the drama Mariyadhai (2009), in the second film with director Vikraman, after Vaanathai Pola followed by the action Engal Aasan (2009), where he co-starred with Vikranth, the cousin of actor Vijay. This year, Vijayakanth received a Filmfare Top 10 Legends of Tamil Cinema Award, over the course of his three-decade career as a screen star.

2010 to 2015: Latest projects 

Vijayakanth acted and directed the film, Virudhagiri (2010), a remake of the French film Taken. After taking a hiatus of five years without films, he made a cameo appearance with his son, the first film of actor Shanmuga Pandian in Sagaptham (2015). In November 2015, he came back to acting in a  feature film - Arun Ponnambalam's Thamizhan Endru Sol, alongside his son, Shanmuga Pandian, the second film with him. The film began production during November 2015, and had been temporarily suspended owing to the upcoming TN Assembly elections and the deteriorating health of Vijayakanth. He played 154 movies and is one of the most adored film personalities in the Tamil industry. Vijayakanth is listed by The Cinemaholic among the top 20 best Tamil actors of all time.

Filmography

Awards and recognitions

Honours

|-
! scope="row" | 1994
| Tamil Nadu State Film Honorary Award
| MGR Award
| 
|-
! scope="row" | 2001
| Kalaimamani Award
| Government of Tamil Nadu
| 
|-
! scope="row" | 2001
| Best Indian Citizen Award
|  Citizens of India Forum
| 
|-
! scope="row" | 2009
|  Top 10 Legends of Tamil Cinema Award
|  Filmfare of Tamil Cinema Award
| 
|-
! scope="row" | 2011
|  Honorary doctorate
|  International Institute of Church Management
| 
|-

Film Awards and nominations
{| class="wikitable"
|-  style="background:#b0c4de; text-align:center;"
! scope="col" | Year
! scope="col" | Category
! scope="col" | Award
! scope="col" | Film
! scope="col" | Result
|-
|1984
|Filmfare Award for Best Actor – Tamil
|Filmfare Awards South
|Vaidehi Kathirunthal
|
|-
|1986
|Filmfare Award for Best Actor – Tamil
|Filmfare Awards South
|Amman Kovil Kizhakale
|
|-
|1986
|Cinema Express Award for Best Actor – Tamil
|Cinema Express Awards
|Amman Kovil Kizhakale
|
|-
|1988
|Filmfare Award for Best Actor – Tamil
|Filmfare Awards South
|Poonthotta Kaavalkaaran
|
|-
|1988
|Best Character Actor
|Cinema Express Awards
|Poonthotta Kaavalkaaran
|
|-
|1988
|Best Character Actor
|Cinema Express Awards
|Senthoora Poove
|
|-
| 1988
|Tamil Nadu State Film Award for Best Actor
|Tamil Nadu State Film Awards
| Senthoora Poove
|
|-
| 1990
|Filmfare Award for Best Actor – Tamil 
|Filmfare Awards South
|Pulan Visaranai
|
|-
| 1992
|Filmfare Award for Best Actor – Tamil 
|Filmfare Awards South
|Chinna Gounder
|
|-
| 1994
|Filmfare Award for Best Actor – Tamil 
||Filmfare Awards South
|Honest Raj
|
|-
| 1996
|Filmfare Award for Best Actor – Tamil
|Filmfare Awards South
|Thayagam
|
|-
| 1996
|Tamil Nadu State Film Award Special Prize
|Tamil Nadu State Film Awards
|Thayagam
|
|-
| 2000
| Best Actor Award
|Cinema Express Awards
|Vaanathaippola
|
|-

Political career

2006–2011

He formed the center-left party Desiya Murpokku Dravida Kazhagam (DMDK), a regional political party in Tamil Nadu. He formally announced the party's formation on 14 September 2005 in Madurai. His party contested in all seats in 2006 assembly elections and won one seat contested by him.
The DMDK, led by Vijaykanth, proved to be an important player in the 2006 Tamil Nadu assembly election, garnering 10% of the voters and securing 10.1% in this Lok Sabha election. According to the study, it secured more votes than the winning margins of candidates in about 25 constituencies. In 2006, polling showed that DMDK was able to get more DMK votes than AIADMK votes, but in this election, they were able to wrestle more Congress voters from 2004 than any other party. Contrary to the claim of many in the AIADMK camp blaming DMDK for the defeat, there is no evidence for this to be true. Vijayakanth has declared that he would not ask donations for his party, and most of the funding for the party comes from his own pocket. He has so far rejected alliances with other political parties. In a by-election to Madurai Central assembly constituency, DMDK secured around 17000 votes, which is just 2000 votes less than AIADMK. DMDK was also able to secure a significant number of seats in Local Body elections.

Leader of the  opposition, 2011

In the 2011 election, held on 13 April 2011, he formed an alliance with All India Anna Dravida Munnetra Kazhagam (AIADMK) and contested in 41 constituencies. His party saw success, winning 29 of the 41 seats it contested. Notably, DMDK won more seats than the Dravida Munnetra Kazhagam (DMK). Vijayakanth occupied the position of MLA for the second time, winning the Rishivandhiyam constituency. Cho Ramaswamy encouraged Desiya Murpokku Dravida Kazhagam (DMDK) to forge an alliance with AIADMK. DMDK launched a vigorous campaign to defeat DMK; it made a resolution to call all parties to come together to defeat the ruling DMK in a conference held in Salem on 8 January, presided over by its leader Vijayakanth. S. Ramadoss, leader of Pattali Makkal Katchi, expressed his dissatisfaction with people from the film industry ruling Tamil Nadu since 1967. He also urged voters not to vote for Vijayakanth with his long career as a Tamil actor.

Following the election, Jayalalithaa and Vijayakanth had exchanges in the assembly that started the rift between the two parties. Due to this reason, Vijayakanth got separated from AIADMK. In the 2014 parliament elections, DMDK forged an alliance with BJP, a non-DMK and non-ADMK alliance of parties such as MDMK, PMK, IJK, and other small parties. PM Modi gave special reference to him in the NDA leaders meet and referred him as his friend. DMDK Leader Vijayakanth lost his position as Leader of Opposition in the Tamil Nadu Legislative Assembly as eight of his MLAs handed over their resignations to the speaker of the Tamil Nadu Legislative Assembly.

2016 election
He lost both his seat and deposit in the 2016 election.  A two-time MLA (2006 and 2011), he was contesting from the Ulundurpettai constituency in Tamil Nadu's Vilupuram district. He could manage only 34,447 votes, which saw him finish third. The seat was won by the ruling All India Anna Dravida Munnetra Kazhagam's (AIADMK) candidate R. Kumaraguru, who polled 81,973 votes. His nearest rival was the Dravida Munnetra Kazhagam (DMK) candidate G.R. Vasanthavel, who managed 77,809 votes to finish second.

Elections contested

Other work
He founded Shri Andal Alagar College of Engineering in 2001. His wife is the chairperson of this college. On 1 October 2001, Vijayakanth declared that 1 October, which is actor Sivaji Ganesan's birthday, be observed as Actors' Day in Tamil Nadu. In 2001, he was the former president of South Indian Film Artistes' Association and under his presidency, the debts of the association were cleared by organising celebrity shows overseas. Vijayakanth has launched a 24-hour television channel called Captain TV on 14 April 2010. He later launched a 24-hour news channel called Captain News on 29 August 2012.

Controversy 
The media has widely publicized an ongoing dispute between Vijayakanth and comedic actor Vadivelu, who was Vijayakanth's co-star in a number of notable films. On 21 September 2008, Vadivelu's residence, located in Saligramam in Chennai, was pelted with stones by a gang, leaving several windows and furniture damaged. Vadivelu reported that he suspected that it was Vijayakanth's men, because of a court case which he had filed against Vijayakanth for assault, for which the final court hearing was to take place the following day. Filing another case for attempted murder against Vijayakanth, Vadivelu mentioned his interest in competing against him in the next assembly elections and "teaching him a lesson." In response, Vijayakanth told a press meet on that Vadivelu's allegations are based on hearsay. During the legislative assembly elections in Tamil Nadu in 2011, Vadivelu vehemently campaigned for the Dravida Munnetra Kazhagam (DMK) and its alliance. During his public speeches, he predominantly condemned Vijayakanth, whose party, the Desiya Murpokku Dravida Kazhagam (DMDK), allied with the opposition party All India Anna Dravida Munnetra Kazhagam (AIADMK). In a campaign speech in Tiruvarur, Vadivelu stated that "(his) only aim is to sweep out Vijayakanth's whole team and to campaign vigorously for DMK's victory". Vadivelu was criticized as being biased, only supporting a DMK-led victory for personal gains and not once mentioning the then-official opposition, the AIADMK, or its leader, J. Jayalalitha. In a turn of events, the election was eventually successful for the AIADMK alliance, while Vijayakanth was victorious by a significant margin in his own constituency. While speaking at an election campaign meeting in 2016, he criticized Rajinikanth, causing a considerable backlash from supporters of Rajinikanth. He has been criticized for making obscene gestures in public, often towards journalists.

References

Further reading

External links

Male actors in Tamil cinema
1952 births
Tamil Nadu politicians
Tamil people
Living people
Indian actor-politicians
Tamil Nadu MLAs 2006–2011
Desiya Murpokku Dravida Kazhagam politicians
Male actors from Madurai
Tamil Nadu State Film Awards winners
Filmfare Awards South winners
Indian political party founders
Leaders of the Opposition in Tamil Nadu
21st-century Indian politicians
21st-century Indian male actors
20th-century Indian male actors
Tamil male actors
Tamil Nadu MLAs 2011–2016